Peter Fieber (born 16 May 1964) is a Slovak football player and later a football manager. He played for Dukla Banská Bystrica, Inter Bratislava, DAC Dunajská Streda, Artmedia Petržalka, Racing Genk and SV Meppen.

He was a member of Czechoslovakia squad at the 1990 FIFA World Cup. He earned three caps for Czechoslovakia and also one cap for Slovakia.

References

External links
 ČMFS entry 

1964 births
Living people
Footballers from Bratislava
Czechoslovak footballers
Slovak footballers
1990 FIFA World Cup players
Slovakia international footballers
Czechoslovakia international footballers
FK Inter Bratislava players
FC Petržalka players
K.R.C. Genk players
SV Meppen players
Slovak Super Liga players
2. Bundesliga players
Dual internationalists (football)
FK Inter Bratislava managers
FC DAC 1904 Dunajská Streda managers
FC Petržalka managers
Czechoslovak expatriate footballers
Expatriate footballers in Belgium
Czechoslovak expatriate sportspeople in Belgium
Association football defenders
Slovak football managers
Slovak expatriate football managers